William Randall Piper (born April 13, 1953) is an American guitarist, best known as the co-founder and original guitarist of the hard rock/heavy metal band W.A.S.P.

Biography
Born in San Antonio, Texas, Piper grew up listening to Elvis Presley records and watching every movie Presley was in. Inspired by his hero, Piper began playing acoustic guitar at age 10. While still in high school, Piper opened a record store in Long Beach, California, called "Wheatstone Bridge". In 1978, Piper opened a rehearsal and recording space called Magnum Opus Studios in Buena Park, California.

In 1977, Piper met another local musician named Blackie Goozeman (later known as Blackie Lawless) at the Starwood in West Hollywood. The two became friends and began recording demos at Piper's Magnum Opus Studio. Piper joined Blackie's band Sister as lead guitarist with Joey Palemo (bass) and Jimi Image (drums) after the original guitarist left. Lawless later changed the name of the band to Circus Circus, allegedly after attending several performances by Ringling Bros. and Barnum & Bailey Circus.

Circus Circus evolved into W.A.S.P. by 1982. The band's live shows incorporated burning signs, mic stands made out of huge chains, and girls dancing in cages. One of the most infamous stage sets featured the illusion of live rats being fed directly into a meat grinder, while the band tossed raw hamburger and chicken livers into the audience. Animal rights groups quickly took offense. 

By the end of 1985, following the release of W.A.S.P.'s second album, Piper decided to leave the band. He later formed the band Animal.

Discography
with W.A.S.P.

W.A.S.P. (1984)
The Last Command (1985)

with Randy Piper's Animal
 900 Lb. Steam (2002)
 Violent New Breed (2006)
 Virus (2008)

External links
Official website

W.A.S.P. members
Living people
1956 births
Locomotive Music artists